Eldon is a masculine given name. Notable people with the name include:

 Eldon Bargewell (1947–2019), American general
 Eldon Danenhauer (1935–2021), American football player
 Eldon Davis (1917–2011), American architect
 Eldon Dedini (1921–2006), American cartoonist
 Eldon Edwards (1909–1960), American Ku Klux Klan leader
 Eldon Fortie (1941–2021), American football player
 Eldon Garnet (born 1946), Canadian artist and novelist
 Eldon Grier (1917–2001), Canadian poet and artist
 Eldon Gorst (1861–1911), British diplomat
 Eldon Griffiths (1925–2014), British politician and journalist
 Eldon C. Hall, American computer engineer
 Eldon Hoke (1958–1997), American musician
 Eldon Jenne (1899–1993), American pole vaulter and sports coach
 Eldon Arthur Johnson (1919–2001), Canadian politician
 Eldon Lautermilch (born 1949), Canadian politician
 Eldon Maquemba (born 1984), Angolan footballer
 Eldon Miller (born 1939), American basketball coach
 Eldon A. Money (1933–2010), American politician and radio  journalist
 Eldon Nelson (1927–2012), American jockey
 Eldon Rathburn (1916–2008), Canadian composer
 Pokey Reddick (born 1964), Canadian hockey player
 Eldon Rudd (1920–2002), American politician
 Eldon Shamblin (1916–1998), American guitarist and arranger
 Eldon Smith, Canadian cardiologist
 Eldon Woolliams (1916–2001), Canadian politician

Fictional
 Eldon Chance, fictional character on the American TV series Chance
 Eldon Tyrell, fictional character in the film Blade Runner

See also
Elden (name)
Eldin (disambiguation), include a list of people with name Eldin

Masculine given names